Peter Pan is a Disney media franchise based on J. M. Barrie's original 1904 play and 1911 novel, which officially commenced with the 1953 theatrical film Peter Pan. The spin-off film series Tinker Bell has continued this franchise into the 21st century.

The franchise is about Peter Pan, a boy who lives in Never Land and refuses to enter the human world and grow up. He takes Wendy Darling's family to his home and shows them around, and together they aim to foil the plan of the evil and vengeful Captain Hook.

The character Tinker Bell is also part of the Disney Fairies franchise.

Films

Main series

Peter Pan (1953)
Peter Pan is a 1953 theatrical film based on the play Peter Pan; or, the Boy Who Wouldn't Grow Up by J. M. Barrie.
The 14th Disney animated feature film.

Peter Pan: Return to Never Land (2002)
Peter Pan: Return to Never Land is a 2002 theatrical film which serves as a sequel to the 1953 film.

Tinker Bell (film series)
The Tinker Bell film series consists of six films, one half-hour special, and one six-minute short, and is based around the character Tinker Bell.

Peter Pan & Wendy (2023)

The Walt Disney Company announced that a live action Peter Pan movie was in development, with David Lowery serving as director, and a script he co-wrote with Toby Halbrooks. On July 31, 2018, it was reported  that the feature-length film would be released exclusively on the company's streaming service, Disney+. On January 7, 2020, casting was underway, and the film was titled Peter Pan & Wendy. Joe Roth and Jim Whitaker serve as producers.

On March 10, 2020, Alexander Molony and Ever Anderson were cast as Peter Pan and Wendy, respectively; while the feature film production, was announced to released theatrically. Principal photography was originally scheduled to begin on April 17, 2020, in Canada. Production on the film was postponed as a precaution, to avoid the pandemic spread of the COVID-19 pandemic. Other cast members announced in 2020 include Jude Law, Yara Shahidi, and Alyssa Wapanatâhk as Captain Hook, Tinker Bell, and Tiger Lily, respectively. Principal photography began on March 16, 2021 and the film is scheduled to be released on Disney+ in 2023.

Theme park attractions

Peter Pan's Flight
Peter Pan's Flight is a ride located in Fantasyland at Disneyland, Walt Disney World, Disneyland Paris, Tokyo Disneyland and Shanghai Disneyland.

Pixie Hollow
Pixie Hollow is a character meet-and-greet located in Fantasyland at Disneyland, and features characters from the Tinker Bell film series.

Back to Never Land
Back to Never Land is a short film shown inside The Magic of Disney Animation at Disney's Hollywood Studios, and Disney Animation at Disney California Adventure.

Following the Leader with Peter Pan
Following the Leader with Peter Pan is a live interactive show located at Adventureland in Disneyland Paris which opened in 2012.

Fantasmic!
The Peter Pan main characters are featured in a scene in the nighttime show Fantasmic!

Meet and greets
Peter Pan, Wendy, Tinker Bell, Captain Hook and Mr. Smee all appear as meetable characters at the Disney Parks and Resorts. Peter Pan, Wendy and Tinker Bell are normally based in Fantasyland, whilst Captain Hook and Mr. Smee are in Adventureland.

Video games

Peter Pan: Adventures in Never Land
Peter Pan: Adventures in Never Land is a 2002 side-scrolling video game.

Peter Pan: The Legend of Never Land
Peter Pan: The Legend of Never Land is a 2005 video game.

Kingdom Hearts
Neverland appears as a playable world in Kingdom Hearts, Kingdom Hearts: Chain of Memories, Kingdom Hearts 358/2 Days, and Kingdom Hearts Birth by Sleep. Peter Pan also appears (along with Tinker Bell) in Kingdom Hearts II as a summon character.

Disney Infinity
Peter Pan was referenced in the Disney Infinity series though power discs and in-game toys. Tinker Bell was added as a playable character starting in the second game, Disney Infinity 2.0 (also known as Disney Infinity: 2.0 Edition), although she was primarily based on her Disney Fairies appearances. Nevertheless, the "Disney's Treasure Hunt" intro to the game included a segment based on the 1953 film where the player flies through London as Tinker Bell.

Peter Pan was planned to be added to the series via an update for Disney Infinity 3.0 after being chosen by "Toy Box Artists" at the 2015 Disney Infinity Toy Box Summit, but further development for the series was cancelled in May 2016, with the Peter Pan figure having never seen release.

Disney Magic Kingdoms
Tinker Bell, Peter Pan, Wendy, John, Michael and Captain Hook appear as playable characters in Disney Magic Kingdoms. While most focus on their versions of Peter Pan, Tinker Bell's version focuses on her version of the Tinker Bell film series. Some attractions based on the franchise also appear in the game, including Pixie Hollow, Peter Pan's Flight, Lost Boys' Hideout, and The Jolly Roger (this last featuring Tick-Tock the Crocodile as a non-player character).

Television series

Once Upon a Time
Every character aside from the Indian Chief from Peter Pan have appeared in the Disney-inspired show Once Upon a Time. The episode "Second Star to the Right" centers around these characters as well as the first half of the shows third season taking place primarily in Neverland. The show also reverses the roles of Peter Pan and Captain Hook in which Pan is the antagonist and Hook is a protagonist. This variation is exclusive to the series.

Jake and the Never Land Pirates
Jake and the Never Land Pirates is a spin-off television series based on Disney's Peter Pan franchise. Further spin-offs of this show include: Playing With Skully, Jake's Never Land Pirate School, Mama Hook Knows Best!, and Jake's Buccaneer Blast.

Tabletop games

Walt Disney's Peter Pan: A Game of Adventure
Walt Disney's Peter Pan: A Game of Adventure is a board game based on the 1953 film, created by Transogram Company.

Music

Disney Fairies: Faith, Trust, and Pixie Dust
Disney Fairies: Faith, Trust, and Pixie Dust is a compilation album with songs from the Tinker Bell film series.

Songs
 "The Second Star to the Right"
 "You Can Fly"
 "A Pirate's Life (Is a Wonderful Life)"
 "Never Smile at a Crocodile"
 "Following the Leader"
 "What Made the Red Man Red?"

Theatre and stage

Disney on Ice
Disney on Ice began a touring production of Peter Pan in 1999.

Cast and characters

References

 
Walt Disney Studios (division) franchises
Animated film series